Lloyd Searwar (July 28, 1925 – April 2, 2006) was a career Guyanese diplomat, and later the Director of the Foreign Service Institute in Guyana. He has a distinguished record of public service and has been a stalwart supporter of literature and culture in Guyana.

Publication
In 1998 Peepal Tree Press published his anthology, They Came in Ships: an Anthology of Indo-Guyanese Writing. This anthology of prose and poetry shows how the Indians changed the character of Guyana and the Caribbean and how, over 150 years of settlement, Indians became Indo-Guyanese.

References

Guyanese writers
2006 deaths
1925 births